Akathisia is a movement disorder characterized by a subjective feeling of inner restlessness accompanied by mental distress and an inability to sit still. Usually, the legs are most prominently affected. Those affected may fidget, rock back and forth, or pace, while some may just have an uneasy feeling in their body. The most severe cases may result in aggression, violence, and/or suicidal thoughts. Akathisia is also associated with threatening behaviour and physical aggression that is greatest in patients with mild akathisia, and diminishing with increasing severity of akathisia.

Antipsychotic medication, particularly the first generation antipsychotics, are a leading cause. Other agents commonly responsible for this side-effect may also include selective serotonin reuptake inhibitors, metoclopramide, and reserpine, though any medication listing agitation as a side effect may trigger it. It may also occur upon stopping antipsychotics. The underlying mechanism is believed to involve dopamine. Diagnosis is based on the symptoms. It differs from restless leg syndrome in that akathisia is not associated with sleeping. However, despite a lack of historical association between restless leg syndrome and akathisia, this does not guarantee that the two conditions do not share symptoms in individual cases. 

Treatment may include switching to an antipsychotic with a lower risk of the condition, if the akathisia was caused by an antipsychotic. The antidepressant mirtazapine has demonstrated benefit, as well as diphenhydramine, trazodone, benzatropine, cyproheptadine, and beta blockers, particularly propranolol. 

The term was first used by Czech neuropsychiatrist Ladislav Haškovec, who described the phenomenon in 1901 long before the discovery of antipsychotics, with drug-induced akathisia first being described in 1960. It is from Greek a-, meaning "not", and  kathízein, meaning "to sit", or in other words an "inability to sit".

Classification 

Akathisia is usually grouped as a medication-induced movement disorder but is also seen to be a neuropsychiatric concern as it can be experienced purely subjectively with no apparent movement abnormalities. Akathisia is generally associated with antipsychotics but it was already described in Parkinson's disease, and other neuropsychiatric disorders. It also presents with the use of non-psychiatric medications, including calcium channel blockers, antibiotics, anti-nausea and anti-vertigo drugs.

Signs and symptoms 
Symptoms of akathisia are often described in vague terms such as feeling nervous, uneasy, tense, twitchy, restless, and an inability to relax. Reported symptoms also include insomnia, a sense of discomfort, motor restlessness, marked anxiety, and panic. Symptoms have also been said to resemble symptoms of neuropathic pain that are similar to fibromyalgia and restless legs syndrome. When due to psychiatric drugs, the symptoms are side effects that usually disappear quickly and remarkably when the medication is reduced or stopped. However, tardive akathisia which has a late onset, may go on long after the medication is discontinued, for months and sometimes years.

When misdiagnosis occurs in antipsychotic-induced akathisia, more antipsychotic may be prescribed, potentially worsening the symptoms. If symptoms are not recognised and identified akathisia can increase in severity and lead to suicidal thoughts, aggression and violence.

Visible signs of akathisia include repetitive movements such as crossing and uncrossing the legs, and constant shifting from one foot to the other. Other noted signs are rocking back and forth, fidgeting and pacing. However, not all observable restless motion is akathisia. For example, mania, agitated depression, and attention deficit hyperactivity disorder may look like akathisia, but the movements feel voluntary and not due to restlessness.

Jack Henry Abbott, who was diagnosed with akathisia, described the sensation in 1981 as: "You ache with restlessness, so you feel you have to walk, to pace. And then as soon as you start pacing, the opposite occurs to you; you must sit and rest. Back and forth, up and down you go … you cannot get relief …"

Causes

Medication-induced 

Medication-induced akathisia is termed acute akathisia and is frequently associated with the use of antipsychotics. Antipsychotics block dopamine receptors, but the pathophysiology is poorly understood. Additionally, drugs with successful therapeutic effects in the treatment of medication-induced akathisia have provided additional insight into the involvement of other transmitter systems. These include benzodiazepines, β-adrenergic blockers, and serotonin antagonists. Another major cause of the syndrome is the withdrawal observed in drug-dependent individuals. Since dopamine deficiency (or disruptions in dopamine signalling) appears to play an important role in the development of Restless Legs Syndrome (RLS), a form of akathisia focused in the legs, the sudden withdrawal or rapidly decreased dosage of drugs which increase dopamine signalling may create similar deficits of the chemical which mimic dopamine antagonism and thus can precipitate RLS. This is why sudden cessation of opioids, cocaine, serotonergics, and other euphoria-inducing substances commonly produce RLS as a side-effect.

Akathisia involves increased levels of the neurotransmitter norepinephrine, which is associated with mechanisms that regulate aggression, alertness, and arousal. It has been correlated with Parkinson's disease and related syndromes, and descriptions of akathisia predate the existence of pharmacologic agents.

Akathisia can be miscoded in side effect reports from antidepressant clinical trials as "agitation, emotional lability, and hyperkinesis (overactivity)"; misdiagnosis of akathisia as simple motor restlessness occurred, but was more properly classed as dyskinesia.

Diagnosis 
The presence and severity of akathisia can be measured using the Barnes Akathisia Scale, which assesses both objective and subjective criteria. Precise assessment of akathisia is problematic, as there are various types making it difficult to differentiate from disorders with similar symptoms.

The primary distinguishing features of akathisia in comparison with other syndromes are primarily subjective characteristics, such as the feeling of inner restlessness and tension. Akathisia can commonly be mistaken for agitation secondary to psychotic symptoms or mood disorder, antipsychotic dysphoria, restless legs syndrome, anxiety, insomnia, drug withdrawal states, tardive dyskinesia, or other neurological and medical conditions.

The controversial diagnosis of "pseudoakathisia" is sometimes given.

Treatment 
Acute akathisia induced by medication, often antipsychotics, is treated by reducing or discontinuing the medication. Low doses of the antidepressant mirtazapine may be of help. Benzodiazepines, such as lorazepam; beta blockers such as propranolol; anticholinergics such as benztropine; and serotonin antagonists such as cyproheptadine may also be of help in treating acute akathisia but are much less effective for treating chronic akathisia. Vitamin B, and iron supplementation if deficient, may be of help.
Although they are sometimes used to treat akathisia, benzodiazepines and antidepressants can actually cause akathisia.

Epidemiology 

As of 2007, published epidemiological data for akathisia was mostly limited to studies before the availability of second-generation antipsychotics. Prevalence rates may be lower for modern treatment as second-generation antipsychotics carry a lower risk of akathisia.

Approximately one out of four individuals treated with first-generation antipsychotics have akathisia.

History 

The term was first used by Czech neuropsychiatrist Ladislav Haškovec, who described the phenomenon in a non-medication induced presentation in 1901.

Reports of medication-induced akathisia from chlorpromazine appeared in 1954. Later in 1960 there were reports of akathisia in response to phenothiazines (a related drug). Akathisia is classified as an extrapyramidal side effect along with other movement disorders that can be caused by antipsychotics.

In the former Soviet Union, akathisia-inducing drugs were allegedly used as a form of torture. Haloperidol, an antipsychotic medication, was used to induce intense restlessness and Parkinson's-type symptoms in prisoners.

In 2020 clinical psychologist and professor of psychology Jordan Peterson was diagnosed with akathisia after being treated for insomnia and depression with benzodiazepines that was associated with an autoimmune disorder and was subsequently treated in Russia.

See also 
 Stimming

Notes

References

External links 

Symptoms and signs: Nervous system
Articles containing video clips
Wikipedia medicine articles ready to translate